FC Sochaux-Montbéliard won Division 1 season 1937/1938 of the French Association Football League with 44 points.

Participating teams

 FC Antibes
 AS Cannes
 SC Fives
 RC Lens
 Olympique Lillois
 Olympique de Marseille
 FC Metz
 RC Paris
 Red Star Olympique
 Excelsior AC Roubaix
 RC Roubaix
 FC Rouen
 FC Sète
 FC Sochaux-Montbéliard
 RC Strasbourg
 US Valenciennes-Anzin

Final table

Promoted from Division 2, who will play in Division 1 season 1938/1939:
 Le Havre AC: Champion of Division 2
 AS Saint-Étienne: Runner-up Division 2

Results

Top goalscorers

References
 Division 1 season 1937-1938 at pari-et-gagne.com

Ligue 1 seasons
France
1